Famine is the first official release by Death Metal act Graves of Valor it was released September 11, 2007 via Tragic Hero Records On May 30th 2006 Graves of Valor released two demo tracks to their Myspace page entitled "Architect" and "Kiss the Snake" The full Track listing was released soon after.

Personnel
David Hasselbring - Bass 
Jeff Springs - Guitar 
Richard Turbeville - Guitar 
Dayton Cantley - Drums 
Damon Welch - Vocals

References

2007 albums